Milyanfan (from  ;) is a village in the Ysyk-Ata District of the Chüy Region of Kyrgyzstan. Its population was 5,271 in 2021. It is located near the southern bank of the river Chüy, which forms Kyrgyzstan's border with Kazakhstan.

Most of the population are ethnic Dungans.

The village is the birthplace of Sergeant Mansuz Vanakhun (ru) (1907–1943), who died heroically during World War II and was awarded, posthumously, the honorary title of Hero of Soviet Union. His house is preserved as a museum, and in 2005 his bust was unveiled in the village.

Population

References 

Populated places in Chüy Region